The 58th Norwegian Biathlon Championships were held in Dombås, Oppland, Norway from 31 March to 3 April 2016 at the stadium Dombås Skiarena, arranged by Dombås IL. There were a total of 8 scheduled competitions: sprint, pursuit, mass start and relay races for men and women.

Ole Einar Bjørndalen only participated in the mass start.

Schedule
All times are local (UTC+1).

Medal winners

Men

Women

References

External links
  

Norwegian Biathlon Championships
2016 in biathlon
2016 in Norwegian sport